The men's singles luge competition at the 1964 Winter Olympics in Innsbruck was held from 30 January to 4 February, at Olympic Sliding Centre Innsbruck. Tragedy affected the event as British luger Kazimierz Kay-Skrzypecki was killed during a practice run on January 23, seven days before the start of the competition.

Results

References

Luge at the 1964 Winter Olympics
Luge